Gianfranco Bedin (born 24 July 1945) is a former Italian footballer who played as a box-to-box or defensive midfielder. Bedin began his career with Internazionale, playing for the team for a decade, and was part of their European Cup victory in 1965; he later also played for Sampdoria, Varese, Livorno and Rondinella. At international level, he also earned 6 caps for the Italy national football team between 1966 and 1972.

Club career
Born in San Donà di Piave, Bedin is mostly remembered for the club football he played whilst at Internazionale from 1964 to 1974, as a member of Helenio Herrera's highly successful "Grande Inter" squad. He appeared in 211 Serie A matches with the Milanese club, winning three Serie A titles, the European Cup, and two Intercontinental Cups, also reaching the Coppa Italia final, as well as another European Cup final. He would later also play for U.C. Sampdoria (1974–78), A.S. Varese 1910 (1978–79), A.S. Livorno Calcio (1979–80), and San Frediano Rondinella S.S. (1980–81), before retiring in 1981.

International career
Bedin also represented Italy national football team at international level, making 6 appearances for the national side between 1966 and 1972, although, despite his success at club level with Inter, he never represented Italy at a major international tournament.

Style of play
Primarily a ball-winner, Bedin was known in particular for his anticipation, stamina, work-rate, man-marking, and his ability to read the game as a defensive or box-to-box midfielder, which allowed him to support his more creative and offensive teammates defensively. A modern, two-way player, he was also capable of starting attacking plays and getting into good offensive positions after winning back possession.

Honours
Inter Milan
Serie A: 1964–65, 1965–66, 1970–71
European Cup: 1964–65
Intercontinental Cup: 1964, 1965

References

External links 

 
Profile at Enciclopediadelcalcio.it

1945 births
Living people
Italian footballers
Italy international footballers
Serie A players
Inter Milan players
U.C. Sampdoria players
S.S.D. Varese Calcio players
U.S. Livorno 1915 players
Association football midfielders